Gelechia machinata is a moth of the family Gelechiidae. It is found in India (Assam).

References

Moths described in 1929
Gelechia